This is a list of notable past and present residents of the U.S. city of Paradise Valley, Arizona.

Arts

Erma Bombeck – humorist
Charles Boyer – actor
Erskine Caldwell – writer
Glen Campbell – musician
Max Cavalera – musician
Alice Cooper – singer
Clive Cussler – writer
Boyé Lafayette De Mente – author, journalist
Hugh Downs – broadcaster
Yvonne Lime Fedderson – philanthropist, founder of Childhelp, former actress
Hunter Gomez – actor
Rob Halford – singer/songwriter
Jenna Jameson – adult film actress
Bil Keane – cartoonist
Cris Kirkwood – musician
Stevie Nicks – singer
Leslie Nielsen – actor
Dave Pratt – radio personality
Paolo Soleri – architect
Emma Stone – actress 
Dick Van Dyke – actor
Asher Angel – actor

Business

Michael Bidwill – businessman, prosecutor, and football executive. The principal owner, chairman, and president of the Arizona Cardinals
Derrick Hall – business executive, President & CEO of the Arizona Diamondbacks
 Bruce Halle – founder and chairman of Discount Tire; richest man in Arizona with net worth of $4.2 billion
Geordie Hormel – heir to Hormel Foods Corp.
Thelma Keane – businesswoman, wife of Bill Keane
Charles Keating – businessman and figure in the Lincoln Savings and Loan scandal
Peter Sperling – businessman
Don Stewart – head of Don Stewart Ministries/Association
Robert Sarver – businessman and Owner of Phoenix Suns

Military

Betty Tackaberry Blake – last surviving member of the first training class of Women Airforce Service Pilots, who with her husband George Blake, built the first house in Paradise Valley.

Politics

Doug Ducey - politician, businessman
Barry Goldwater - U.S. Senator and 1964 Republican Presidential Nominee.  
G. Gordon Liddy - Watergate Scandal, Nixon appointee
Sandra Day O'Connor - former Justice of the US Supreme Court
Dan Quayle - Vice President of the United States (1989-1993), United States Senator from Indiana (1981-1989), and U.S. Representative of Indiana's 4th congressional district (1977-1981)
William Rehnquist - Chief Justice of the US Supreme Court

Science

 Paul Davies - physicist and author
Professor Robley D. Evans - nuclear medicine pioneer, winner of the 1990 Enrico Fermi Award

Sport

Muhammad Ali - boxer
Charles Barkley - basketball player
Devin Booker - basketball player
Steve Bush - football player
Keith Carney - ice hockey defenseman
Vinnie Del Negro - NBA coach
Jermaine Dye - baseball player
Jeff Fassero - baseball player
Larry Fitzgerald - football player
Mark Grace - baseball player
Jeff Hornacek - basketball player, NBA coach
Jason Kidd - basketball player, NBA coach
Randy Johnson - baseball pitcher
Nikolai Khabibulin - ice hockey goaltender
Miguel Montero - baseball player
Steve Nash - basketball player
Shaquille O'Neal - basketball player
Jesse Owens - sprinter
Michael Phelps - swimmer
Tom Sneva - auto racer
Terrell Suggs - football player
Mike Tyson - boxer
Kurt Warner - football player
Matt Williams - baseball player
Kerry Wood - baseball pitcher

References

 
Paradise Valley
Paradise Valley, Arizona